The Mihrimah Sultan Mosque (İskele Mosque, Jetty Mosque) is a 16th century Ottoman mosque Overlooking the waterfront in the historic center of the Üsküdar district of Istanbul, Turkey. One of Üsküdar's best-known landmarks, it takes its alternative name from the ferry terminal near which it stands. Before the coast road was built the mosque would have stood right beside the water, accessible by boat.

History
The mosque was designed by the imperial architect Mimar Sinan and built between 1543-44 and 1548. It is the earlier of the two Friday mosques in Istanbul commissioned by Mihrimah Sultan, daughter of Sultan Suleiman the Magnificent and wife of Grand Vizier Rüstem Pasha.

Architecture
The large mosque stands on a raised platform with a broad double portico that contains a fine marble ablutions fountain.  The architecture features several hallmarks of Mimar Sinan's mature style: a spacious, high-vaulted basement, slender minarets and a single-domed baldacchino flanked by three semi-domes ending in three exedrae. 

The exterior is composed of ashlar, a thin dressed stone of gray to cream color. The interior walls and mimber are of Imported marble surrounds. 

One of the minarets still bears a carved sundial.  

It was originally part of a complex, parts of which also survive although they now have different purposes.

Gallery

See also
List of Friday mosques designed by Mimar Sinan
 Mihrimah Mosque (Edirnekapı)

References

Sources

External links

Photographs of the Mihrimah Sultan Mosque by Dick Osseman
Mihrimah Sultan Külliyesi at Üsküdar, Archnet

Mosque buildings with domes
Religious buildings and structures completed in 1548
Mimar Sinan buildings
Ottoman mosques in Istanbul
Üsküdar
1548 establishments in the Ottoman Empire
16th-century mosques